Million Dollar Listing Miami was an American reality television series that premiered June 25, 2014, on Bravo. It features three Miami-based real estate agents – Chad Carroll, Chris Leavitt, and Samantha DeBianchi  – as they balance their personal and professional lives. Announced in October 2013, Million Dollar Listing Miami is the second spin-off of Million Dollar Listing Los Angeles, following Million Dollar Listing New York.

The show ran for one season. There was no official cancellation.

Realtors
 Chad Carroll, Executive Vice-President at Douglas Elliman
 Chris Leavitt, one of the top brokers at Douglas Elliman
 Samantha DeBianchi, founder of DeBianchi Real Estate

Episodes

References

2010s American reality television series
2014 American television series debuts
2014 American television series endings
English-language television shows
Television shows set in Miami
Bravo (American TV network) original programming
Reality television spin-offs
Television series by World of Wonder (company)
Property buying television shows
American television spin-offs